Ana María Miranda Urbina (born 21 March 1949) is a Chilean musician and political activist. She gained fame during the military dictatorship of Chile, where she participated in various musical collaborations with the armed resistance.

Biography 
Ana María Miranda was born on March 21st, 1949, to Braulio Miranda and Olga Urbina. She joined the Symphonic Choir of the University of Chile between 1968 and 1970, and studied advertising at the Technical University of the State.

She worked in the Administrative Headquarters in the Ministry of Education during the presidency of Salvador Allende, where she met Sergio Ortega, a fellow musician. She later married and had her only son with him, Chañaral Ortega-Miranda.

After the 1973 Chilean coup, she moved to France, where she recorded several songs in exile, some with the collaboration of Ortega and Claudio Iturra.

She returned to Chile in 1978, and joined the armed resistance in Chile, singing in towns, prisons, and festivals. This is when she collaborated on the album Chile ríe y canta, sang with René Largo Farías, and published her first album, Miranda al Frente, which she dedicated to the Manuel Rodríguez Patriotic Front.

In 1988, she helped found the Dignity and Justice Movement. In 1993, she participated in a show with Sergio Ortega singing La Gran Traición at the Universidad de Chile Theater.

In 2005, two years after the death of Sergio Ortega, she recorded the album Arderá al Viento tu Canción in his honor.

She currently resides in Buenos Aires, Argentina.

Discography 
 1987 – Miranda al Frente
Soy Mujer
Que No Se Los Lleve El Humo
Yo Te Nombro Libertad (originally performed by Gian Franco Pagliaro)
Chile Resistencia (originally performed by Inti-Illimani)
Himno de Las Milicias Rodriguistas
Himno del Frente Patriótico Manuel Rodríguez (originally performed by Inti-Illimani and Patricio Manns)
El Miliciano
Libre Vendrás
Y Va A Caer
Por Ti Juventud (originally performed by Ismael Durán)
Canción Por La Vida (originally performed by Pato Valdivia)
 2005 – Arderá al Viento tu Canción 
 Los Pájaros perdidos
 El Banderón
 Naranjo en flor
 Chanson des vieux amants
 Milonga de la anunciación
 Juana de Calama
 El último café
 Canción Posible
 Soneto
 A un semejante
 Gracias a pesar de todo
 Barcarola
 Volverás

Notes

References

External links 
 Ana María Miranda's website (in Spanish)
 Ana María Miranda on Facebook

Chilean songwriters
Chilean women musicians

Chilean musicians
Chilean communists

1949 births
Living people